The 1936–37 Chicago Black Hawks season was the team's 11th season in the NHL, and they were coming off a quick playoff exit, as the Hawks lost to the underdog New York Americans in the 1st round of the 1936 playoffs.  The Black Hawks would then have their worst season since 1928–29, as the team finished with only 35 points with a 14–27–7 record, and missed the playoffs for the first time since 1932–33.  Chicago scored an NHL low 99 goals, and gave up 131 goals, the 2nd highest total in the league.

Paul Thompson would lead the Hawks offensively, scoring a club high in goals (17) and points (35).  Team captain Johnny Gottselig had a team high 21 assists.  Pep Kelly, who the Hawks acquired in a trade with the Toronto Maple Leafs midway through the season, scored 13 goals in 29 games with Chicago after scoring only 2 goals in 16 games with the Leafs.  Defenseman Earl Seibert led all defensemen with 9 goals and 15 points, and had a team high 46 penalty minutes.

In goal, Mike Karakas would get all the action, winning 14 games, earning 5 shutouts, and posting a 2.64 GAA.

The Black Hawks would fail to qualify for the playoffs for the first time since 1933, as they finished in the cellar of the American Division, 12 points behind the 3rd place New York Rangers.

Season standings

Record vs. opponents

Schedule and results

Regular season

Player statistics

Scoring leaders

Goaltending

See also
 1936–37 NHL season

References

SHRP Sports
The Internet Hockey Database
National Hockey League Guide & Record Book 2007

Chicago Blackhawks seasons
Chicago
Chicago